The Bells of St. Mary's is a 1959 television adaptation of the famous 1945 film. The television version is directed by Tom Donovan, and stars Claudette Colbert and Marc Connelly.

Plot
The story of a group of nuns at the convent of St. Mary's and their efforts to convince a millionaire to help pay for the repairs to their poorly capitalized and decaying parochial school building.

Cast
Claudette Colbert as Sister Benedict
Marc Connelly
Glenda Farrell
Nancy Marchand as Sister Michael
Barbara Myers
Robert Preston as Father O'Malley
Charles Ruggles

References

External links
 

1959 drama films
American black-and-white films
1959 television films
1959 films
American drama television films
1950s English-language films
1950s American films